Giuseppe Maria Bottari, O.F.M. Conv. (1646–1729) was a Roman Catholic prelate who served as Bishop of Pula (1695–1729).

Biography
Giuseppe Maria Bottari was born in Venice, Italy. In 1689, he was appointed Minister General of Order of Friars Minor Conventual. On 4 Jul 1695, he was appointed by Pope Innocent XII as Bishop of Pula. On 10 Jul 1695, he was consecrated bishop by Pier Matteo Petrucci, Cardinal-Priest of San Marcello with Francesco Gori, Bishop of Catanzaro, and Domenico Diez de Aux, Bishop of Gerace, as co-consecrators. He served as Bishop of Pula until his death in Sep 1729.

See also 
Catholic Church in Croatia

References

External links and additional sources
 (for Chronology of Bishops) 
 (for Chronology of Bishops) 

17th-century Roman Catholic bishops in Croatia
18th-century Roman Catholic bishops in Croatia
1646 births
1729 deaths
Bishops appointed by Pope Innocent XII
Republic of Venice clergy
Italian expatriate bishops
18th-century Roman Catholic bishops in the Holy Roman Empire